Peter Zeitlinger A.S.C. (born 6 June 1960, in Prague) is a Czechoslovakian-born Austrian cinematographer, who has worked with the director Werner Herzog since 1995. Their film Encounters at the End of the World was nominated for the Academy Award 2009. Peter Zeitlinger studied from 1980 – 1987 at the University of Music and Performing Arts, Vienna. He was influenced by Michael Snow and Peter Kubelka followed by Vittorio Storaro, Sven Nykvist and Vilmos Zsigmond. Zeitlinger's films have received considerable critical acclaim and achieved popularity on the art house circuit.
He is represented by the Gersh Agency and is a member of the German Film Academy. Peter Zeitlinger is Professor of Cinematography at the University of Television and Film Munich. He lives in Premariacco, Friuli, Italy.

Work with Werner Herzog

Death for Five Voices (1995)
Little Dieter Needs to Fly (1997)
Wings of Hope (1998)
Invincible (2001)
Wheel of Time (2003)
Grizzly Man (2005)
Rescue Dawn (2007)
Encounters at the End of the World (2008)
Bad Lieutenant: Port of Call New Orleans (2009)
My Son, My Son, What Have Ye Done? (2009)
Cave of Forgotten Dreams (2011)
Into the Abyss (2011)
From One Second to the Next (2013)
Queen of the Desert (2015)
Lo and Behold (2016)
Into the Inferno (2016)
Salt and Fire (2016)
Fireball (2020)

Other features
Tommaso (2019) dir. Abel Ferrara
Pretenders (2018) dir. James Franco
Future World (2017) dir. James Franco
Fear of the Idyll (Die Angst vor der Idylle) (1996) dir. Götz Spielmann
Animal Love (1995) dir. Ulrich Seidl
Der Nachbar (1993) dir. Götz Spielmann
Dieses naive Verlangen (1993) dir. Götz Spielmann
Loss Is to Be Expected (Mit Verlust ist zu rechnen) (1992) dir. Ulrich Seidl
Good News (1990) dir. Ulrich Seidl
Erwin und Julia (1990) dir. Götz Spielmann
Abschied von Hölderlin (1985) dir. Götz Spielmann
Foreign Land (1983) dir. Götz Spielmann

Awards
"German Cinematography Award" for Best Cinematography (2012)
"Romy (TV award)" for Best Cinematography (2013)
"Independent Spirit Award" nominated for Best Cinematography (2010)
"Cinema Eye Honors" for Best Cinematography (2009)
"Romy (TV award)" for Best Cinematography (2007)

References 

Award-winning Cinematographer Peter Zeitlinger Speaks to Locarno Summer Academy Students
Surfing on Incidents: A Conversation with Peter Zeitlinger
DoP Peter Zeitlinger: the ‘dark side’ of  digital filmmaking (© Cécile Mella)
PETER ZEITLINGER: DANCING WITH THE CAMERA  by Michael Guarneri
KÖNIGIN DER WÜSTE: Bildgestalter Peter Zeitlinger über die Dreharbeiten
PETER ZEITLINGER – DOP of "Queen of the Desert" by Werner Herzog
Berlinale Talents Measuring the Space: The Cinematography of Peter Zeitlinger

1960 births
Living people
Austrian cinematographers